"Run Till It's Dark" is an episode of The Dick Powell Show. It starred Tuesday Weld and Fabian; the latter was cast on the strength of his performance in "A Lion Walks Among Us" on Bus Stop.

Hal Humphrey of the Los Angeles Times called it the worst drama in an anthology series for 1962. "To this day, no one has figured out what the drama was about."

References

External links
Run Till It's Dark at IMDb
Run Til It's Dark at BFI
Run Till It's Dark at Fabianforte.net

1962 American television episodes